CUWS may refer to:

 Cambridge University Wine Society
 Cambridge University Wireless Society
 Congressional Union for Woman Suffrage
 Common Use Web Services